Captain Tempesta (original title: Capitan Tempesta) is a historical adventure novel written by Italian author Emilio Salgari, published in 1905. Set against the backdrop of the Siege of Famagusta during the Ottoman–Venetian War (1570–1573) it features the first female swordswoman in Italian popular fiction, the Duchess Eleanora d'Eboli, better known as Captain Tempesta.  

The novel and its sequel The Lion of Damascus were adapted for the big screen in 1942. The films were directed by Corrado D'Errico and starred Carla Candiani as Captain Tempesta.

In 2009 it was selected by Julia Eccleshare as one of the 1001 Children's Books You Must Read Before You Grow Up.

Plot introduction
A warrior in disguise. A lover to be rescued. A city under siege.

Cyprus, 1570. An island at war. The powerful Ottoman army has taken every city save one, Famagusta, a Venetian port and stronghold. Besieged by a force of 80,000 men, they city has valiantly fought back with its small force of warriors and mercenaries. The greatest among them is Captain Tempesta, a young noble unmatched in bravery and swordsmanship. Few, however, know the captain's secret... that she has donned armour and passed herself off as a man in order to search for her beloved who has been imprisoned by the Turks. Will she triumph? The odds are overwhelmingly against her. The Turks are preparing to storm the city and slay all those within it, and still there has been no word of her beloved's whereabouts...

Characters
 Captain Tempesta -The Duchess Eleanora D'Eboli, master swordswoman
 The Viscount Le Hussière - her beloved
 Sir Perpignan - her lieutenant  
 El-Kadur - her loyal Arab servant
 Master Rako - a Venetian quartermaster
 Nikola Stradioto - a Greek ship's captain
 The Lion of Damascus - The greatest warrior in the Ottoman Empire
 Haradja - A pasha's daughter and master of Cornaro Castle
 Metiub - Captain of the Ottoman Naval Infantry and Haradja's right-hand man

Other Novels by Emilio Salgari

Novels in the Sandokan Series:
 The Mystery of the Black Jungle
 The Tigers of Mompracem
 The Pirates of Malaysia
 The Two Tigers
 The King of the Sea
 Quest for a Throne

Novels in The Black Corsair series 
 The Black Corsair
 The Queen of the Caribbean
 Son of the Red Corsair

References

External links
 
 Read the first chapter.
 Captain Tempest on the IMDB.
 The Lion of Damascus on the IMDB.
 Italy's enduring love affair with Emilio Salgari, The Economist, June 2017
 Capitan Tempesta, l'eroina di Salgari amata da Guevara, ilgiornale.it, 2012
 Di Hamid o del bel Capitan Tempesta, ovvero di Eleonora duchessa d’Eboli, Claudio Gallo & Giuseppe Bonomi.
 At the Walls of Famagusta. Emilio Salgari versus Wu Ming: Reshaping a Historical Event. Mimmo Cangiano, Italica Vol. 92, No. 3 (FALL 2015), pp. 625-640.
 Review on Rikipedia (Italian)

1900 novels
Novels by Emilio Salgari
Italian adventure novels
20th-century Italian novels
Fictional knights
Fictional feminists and women's rights activists
Fictional Italian people
Fictional swordfighters
1905 Italian novels
Italian books
 Italian historical novels